Cueva de los Casares is a cave in Riba de Saelices (Province of Guadalajara, Castile-La Mancha, Spain). Discovered in 1933, it contains a number of paleolithic cave paintings, and is most notable for a series of paintings depicting what some have argued is the earliest representation of human understanding of the reproductive process, featuring images of copulation (perhaps mediated by a mysterious shaman figure), pregnancy, childbirth, and family life. Mammoths and other animals feature frequently in the illustrations. It was declared Bien de Interés Cultural in 1935.

There are many representations of animals, anthropomorphs (human-like figures), and ideomorphs (including penises, vulvas, tools, and more abstract images).

The cave and its paintings are little known to scholars outside Spain.

References

External links
Cave art in the Iberian peninsula

Archaeological sites in Castilla–La Mancha
Prehistoric sites in Spain
Casares
Bien de Interés Cultural landmarks in the Province of Guadalajara
Geography of the Province of Guadalajara
Landforms of Castilla–La Mancha
Riba de Saelices